Barney is a 1976 Australian film for children set during the Convict Era. A 12-year-old boy and a convict are shipwrecked together.

It was also known as Lost in the Wild.

Plot
In the 1880s, a small boy called Barney, a wombat called Amanda and an Irish convict called Rafe are the sole survivors of a shipwreck. They head off to Ballarat together to find Barney's father. On the way two gypsy woman drug Rafe and try to steal Barney's money. Rafe is wrongly accused of horse theft and he is imprisoned, but Barney helps him escape. Barney is eventually reunited with his father.

Cast
Brett Maxworthy as Barney Dawson
Sean Kramer as Rafe Duggan
Lionel Long as Charles Dawson
Spike Milligan as Hawker
Jack Allen as Sergeant

Production
The budget was provided by Columbia Pictures and Australian Film Commission. Shooting began in May 1976 on the New South Wales coast and at the Australiana Pioneer Village at Wilberforce.

Release
Despite the involvement of a Hollywood studio, commercial results were disappointing in Australia. However it performed better in Hong Kong and Japan.

References

External links
 
Barney at Oz Movies

1976 films
1970s adventure films
Films set in colonial Australia
Columbia Pictures films
1970s English-language films
1970s Australian films